Michel Herbillon (born 6 March 1951) is a French politician of the Republicans who currently serves as a member of the National Assembly of France, representing the Val-de-Marne department.

Political career
In parliament, Herbillon serves on the Committee on Foreign Affairs and the Committee on European Affairs. In addition to his committee assignments, he is part of the French-Cambodian Parliamentary Friendship Group. Since 2019, he has also been a member of the French delegation to the Franco-German Parliamentary Assembly.

Political positions
In the Republicans’ 2016 presidential primaries, Herbillon endorsed Jean-François Copé as the party's candidate for the office of President of France. In the Republicans’ 2017 leadership election, he endorsed Laurent Wauquiez. In the Republicans’ 2017 leadership election, he endorsed Laurent Wauquiez.

In July 2019, Herbillon voted against the French ratification of the European Union’s Comprehensive Economic and Trade Agreement (CETA) with Canada.

Personal life
On 15 March 2020, Herbillon tested positive for COVID-19.

References

1951 births
Living people
Union for a Popular Movement politicians
The Republicans (France) politicians
Deputies of the 12th National Assembly of the French Fifth Republic
Deputies of the 13th National Assembly of the French Fifth Republic
Deputies of the 14th National Assembly of the French Fifth Republic
Deputies of the 15th National Assembly of the French Fifth Republic
Deputies of the 16th National Assembly of the French Fifth Republic